Vsevolod Mikhaylovich Abramovich (August 11, 1890 – April 24, 1913) was a pioneering aviator.

Biography
Abramovich was born on August 11, 1890 in Odessa, son of poet Mikhail Abramovich and grandson of the Yiddish writer Mendele Mocher Sforim. He studied at the Charlottenburg technical college. In 1911 he earned a pilot's licence. He began working for the Wright brothers' German subsidiary, Flugmaschinen Wright in Johannisthal, and became their chief test pilot.

In 1912, Abramovich built his own aircraft, the Abramovich Flyer, based on what he had learned at the Wright factory. He flew it to Saint Petersburg, Russia to participate in a military aircraft competition.

The same year, he set a world altitude record of 2,100 meters (6,888 feet) and an endurance record for carrying four passengers for 46 minutes and 57 seconds. He was killed in an aviation accident while instructing a student pilot, Evgeniya Shakhovskaya, at Johannisthal on April 24, 1913.

References

1890 births
1913 deaths
Engineers from Odesa
People from Odessky Uyezd
Odesa Jews
Aviators from the Russian Empire
Inventors from the Russian Empire
Flight instructors
Flight endurance record holders
20th-century Ukrainian inventors
Russian aviation record holders
Aviators killed in aviation accidents or incidents in Germany
Burials at Nikolskoe Cemetery
20th-century Ukrainian engineers
20th-century Ukrainian Jews
Emigrants from the Russian Empire to the German Empire